The Battle of Cardal (also known as Battle of Cordón), on 20 January 1807, was the main conflict between the  Spanish defense forces of Montevideo, Uruguay, and British troops during the siege of Montevideo during the second British invasion of the River Plate. The British won an easy victory over the outnumbered opposing forces, which paved the way for the fall of the city,

References
 Carlos Roberts, Las invasiones inglesas del Río de la Plata(1806-1807): (1806-1807), ( The British invasions of the Río de la Plata (1806–1807): (1806–1807),_  Emecé Editores, 2000, 9789500420211
 Lancelot Holland  1975.Expedición al Río de la Plata (Expedition to the River Plate)  Editorial Universitaria de Buenos Aires Colección Siglo y Medio.. 1975
 Andrew Graham-Yooll (2006).Ocupación y reconquista 1806-1807: a 200 años de las Invasiones Inglesas. (Occupation and reconquest 1806-1807: 200 years of the British Invasions.)  2006.  

Battles involving Spain
Battles involving the United Kingdom
British invasions of the River Plate
January 1807 events
1807 in Uruguay
Conflicts in 1807
Florida Department